Ruth Pirret (24 July 1874 - 19 June 1939) was a Scottish scientist working in the field of radioactivity and the first woman to graduate from the University of Glasgow with a BSc. She was the second woman to register as a research student at the University after Louise McIlroy. Her research contributed to the understanding of radioactive decay.

Biography 
Pirret was born on 24 July 1874 to Violet Brown and Reverend David Pirret in Milton, Glasgow.

In 1892 she matriculated at the University of Glasgow, one of the first women to do. While a student she won eight prizes including  the Advanced Practical Physiology. She graduated with a BSc in Pure Science on 12 April 1898, the first woman at the University to graduate with a BSc.

After graduation she taught at schools in Kilmacolm and Newcastle.

She returned to the University of Glasgow in 1909, registering to be research assistant, only the second woman to do so at the University. She researched the chemistry of radioactive elements with Frederick Soddy in 1909, developing the disintegration theory of radioactivity and publishing 'The ratio between uranium and radium in minerals'.

During World War I she researched corrosion of boilers in marine engines for the British Admiralty.

She became Vice Warden of Ashburne House Hall in Manchester before moving to London where she shared a house with sister Mary Margaret Pirret (1876-1942), a physician.

She died in London on 19 June 1939.

References

1874 births
1939 deaths
Scottish women chemists
Scottish chemists
Scottish women scientists
Alumni of the University of Glasgow
Scientists from Glasgow
Scottish women academics